Daniel Jenifer (April 15, 1791 – December 18, 1855) was an American lawyer and statesman from Charles County, Maryland. He was also the nephew of Daniel of St. Thomas Jenifer. He graduated from Charlotte Hall Military Academy. He represented Maryland's 1st Congressional district in the U.S. Congress in 1831–1833 and the 7th district from 1835 to 1841. From 1841 to 1845 he served as U.S. Minister to the Austrian Empire.

His uncle, Daniel of St. Thomas Jenifer, was a signer of the United States Constitution. His family home was known as Retreat and is located in Port Tobacco, Maryland.

Career 
Daniel Jenifer was born in Charles County, Maryland. He was a nephew of Daniel of St. Thomas Jenifer (1723-1790), one of the signers of the Declaration of Independence, and the son-in-law of Congressman John Campbell (1765-1828). He attended public schools and then studied law. In the early 1830s, he began a political career as a member of the short-lived National Republican Party. After the dissolution of his party in the mid-1830s, he became a member of the Whigs.

In the congressional elections of 1830 Jenifer was elected in the first constituency of Maryland in the US House of Representatives in Washington, DC, where he succeeded on 4 March 1831, the successor to Clement Dorsey. Since he was not re-elected in 1832, he was initially only able to complete only one term in Congress until March 3, 1833. This was marked by discussions about the policies of President Andrew Jackson. In these years, the Nullification Crisis reached its peak with the state of South Carolina. In 1834 Jenifer was re-elected to Congress in the seventh district of his state, where he was able to complete three more legislative periods between March 4, 1835, and March 3, 1841. There he experienced until 1837 the final phase of the term of President Jackson.

After the end of his time in the US House of Representatives Daniel Jenifer was appointed by President John Tyler as successor to Henry Muhlenberg, the ambassador to Vienna. In this capacity he served until 1845. Then he was replaced by the former congressman from Georgia, William Henry Stiles. Between 1845 and 1851, Daniel Jenifer was a notary for wills in Charles County. He died on December 18, 1855, near Port Tobacco Village.

References

External links

1791 births
1855 deaths
People from Port Tobacco Village, Maryland
Maryland Whigs
Ambassadors of the United States to Austria
Charlotte Hall Military Academy alumni
19th-century American diplomats
National Republican Party members of the United States House of Representatives from Maryland
Whig Party members of the United States House of Representatives
19th-century American politicians
Jenifer family